Elizabeth Baring (1702 – 1766) was an English merchant.

Born Elizabeth Vowler, she married the German immigrant Johann Baring, who founded a successful wool trade business which became one of the major companies in the British wooling industry. They had five children: John, Thomas, Francis, Charles, and Elizabeth. She took over the company after the death of her spouse in 1748. She managed it with success and was described as an intelligent woman with a good sense of business, and was among the more successful businesswomen in Britain at the time. Her company grew to become one of the largest in Britain and the foundation of what was later to become the Barings Bank.

References

18th-century English businesswomen
1702 births
1766 deaths
Businesspeople from Exeter